Succession War is Hong Kong historical drama created and produced by Chong Wai-kin for TVB, starring Ruco Chan, Shaun Tam, Selena Lee, Natalie Tong and Elaine Yiu as the main leads. The show is a fictional biography story about the last 28 days of the life of Qing dynasty court official Heshen, who is known for being the most corrupt court official in Chinese history. Succession War premiered on 25 June 2018 on TVB Jade.

Premise
Succession War stars Ruco Chan as Heshen of the Niohuru clan, a Qing dynasty official who came into power under the reign of the Qianlong Emperor. The drama depicts the last 28 days of his life, with each episode covering the course of one day. Succession War details the events and characters of the time that ultimately lead to Heshen's death.

Cast and characters
Some names are romanized based on historical ethnic romanizations, while others may be romanized in either Mandarin or Cantonese romanization.

Qing Imperial Family
Lily Leung as Lady Niohuru, the Empress Dowager Chongqing, Qianlong's late mother and Jiaqing's late grandmother
KK Cheung as Qianlong, the Retired Emperor, Jiaqing's father who favors Heshen
Episode 4: Succumbs to poisoning by Jiaqing
Angelina Lo as Lady Barin, the Dowager Noble Consort Ying, Qianlong's consort
Shaun Tam as Jiaqing Emperor, Qianlong's fifteenth son and successor who is intimidated by Heshen's power
Jess Sum as Hitara Shuk-yung, the Empress Xiaoshurui, Jiaqing's late empress
Selena Lee as Niohuru Ling-yee, the Empress Xiaoherui, Jiaqing's empress, first introduced as his Imperial Noble Consort
Yoyo Chen as Liugiya Ching-yee, the Noble Consort Xian, Jiaqing's consort
Siu Hoi Yan as Lady Hougiya, the Consort Hua, Jiaqing's consort
Katherine Ho as Lady Niohuru, the Concubine Ru, Jiaqing's concubine
Kathy Fung as Concubine Hui, Jiaqing's concubine
Aliya Fan as Jiaqing's concubine
Hebe Chan as Jiaqing's concubine
Wingto Lam as Jiaqing's concubine
Yu Chi Ming as Hongxiao, Prince Yi of the First Rank, Qianlong's cousin
Savio Tsang as Yongxuan, Prince Yi of the First Rank, Qianlong's eighth son, leaves the ranks in episode 27 over distraught and depression
David Do as Yongxing, Prince Cheng of the First Rank, Qianlong's eleventh son
Jonathan Cheung as Yonglin, the Seventeenth Imperial Prince, Qianlong's seventeenth son and Jiaqing's younger brother
Stephanie Ho as Gurun Princess Hexiao, personal name: Sheung-sheung, Qianlong's tenth daughter and the wife of Fengshen Yinde
Nono Yeung as Mianning, Jiaqing's son

Niohuru Household
Ruco Chan as Niohuru Heshen, the most powerful and corrupt official in the Qing Court
Natalie Tong as Tau Kau, Heshen's lover and trusted aide, whom he has proposed to many times
Kimmy Kwan as Fung Tzs-man, Heshen's late wife
Elaine Yiu as Cheung Mei, Heshen's second wife, who was educated in Europe
Michelle Wong as Ng Hing-lin, Heshen's concubine
Lena Wong as Nalan, Heshen's concubine
Eddie Pang as Niohuru Helin, Heshen's younger brother and a general
Episode 14: Commits suicide 
Matthew Ho as Niohuru Fengshen Yinde, the Prince Consort, Heshen's eldest son and the husband of Gurun Princess Hexiao
Stephanie Ho as Gurun Princess Hexiao, Qianlong's daughter and the wife of Fengshen Yinde
Lau Chong Hei as Niohuru Fu'en, Heshen's grandson and the son of Fengshen Yinde and Gurun Princess Hexiao
Henry Lo as Lau Chuen, Heshen's steward and most loyal to Heshen. He is killed by an army raid after Tau Kau betrays him by talking to Janggiya Nayancheng in Episode 27.
Leo Kwan as Yuen Po, Heshen's servant
Apple Chan as Mau Tan, Cheung Mei's personal maid

Qing Court
Ruco Chan as Niohuru Heshen; Grand Secretary, Senior Grand Councillor, Nine Gates Infantry Commander, & Grand Minister Supervisor of the Imperial Household Department
Episode 5: Dismissed from duties as the Nine Gates Infantry Commander & Grand Minister Supervisor of the Imperial Household Department
Lee Shing-cheong as Lau Yung, Grand Secretary
Henry Yu as Kei Hiu-lam, Grand Councillor and Minister of Rites
Law Lok Lam as Chu Kwai, Grand Councillor and Minister of Personnel (
To Yin-gor as Janggiya Agui, Grand Councillor
Episode 1: Commits suicide after failing to assassinate Heshen (through a sword duel) and Qianlong (through a burning cloak)
Kwan Wai Lun as Tatara Suringga, Minister of Justice
Episode 14: Sentenced to death for hiding Helin
Eddie Li as Pang Yuen-shui, Minister of Works
Kong Fu Keung as Kam Shi-chung, Minister of War
Lee Hoi Sang as Shum Chor, Minister of Revenue
Episode 13: Assassinated by Tau Kau and Lam Kan
Leo Tsang as Lee Si-yiu, Viceroy of Minzhe
Joel Chan as Fuca Fuchang'an, Viceroy of Grain Transport
Benny Tsang as Ng Sang-lan, Senior Deputy Minister of Rites
Terrence Huang as Lee Wong, Senior Deputy Minister of War
Joe Tang as Chan Tsang-hei, Senior Deputy Minister of Justice
Episode 7: Executed on charges of corruption
Kings Wong as Murca Chengshu, Junior Deputy Minister of Revenue
Ray Lo as Lee Kwong-wan, Minister of the Court of the Imperial Stud
Tony Chui as Tai Kui-hang
William Chan as Hada Nara Yulin, Chief Supervisor of Instruction
George Ng as Siu Yat-hong, Deputy Director-General of the Intelligence Bureau
Kenneth Fok as Fuca Fuk'anggan, a general and Fuchang'an's late older brother
Matthew Ho as Niohuru Fengshen Yinde, Director-General of the Intelligence Bureau & Grand Minister Supervisor of the Imperial Household Department
Andrew Yuen as Borjigit Lavan Dorji, the Prince Jasagh of the First Rank, a prince of the Khalkha Mongols
Eddie Pang as Niohuru Helin, General of Shandong
Kelvin Yuen as Pok Tok-ngok, Deputy General and Fuchang'an's subordinate
Frankie Choi as Lau Wan-chi, Prefect of Shuntian; and Lau Yung's adopted son and nephew
Episode 7: Executed on charges of corruption
Ricky Wong as Fuca Mingliang, Deputy General of Shandong and Helin's subordinate; cousin of Fuchang'an
Willie Lau as Kei Chun, Regimental Commander of the Vanguard Battalion

Imperial Servants
Chan Wing Chun as Cho Tsun-hei, Head Eunuch and Qianlong's personal eunuch
Sunny Dai as Little Eunuch Tak, Jiaqing's personal eunuch
Samantha Chuk as Granny Fong, Dowager Noble Consort Ying's personal maid
GoGo Cheung as Suet Ying, Noble Consort Xian's personal maid
Clevis Tam as Sheung Chun, a eunuch who is murdered by Jiaqing after becoming accidentally poisoned in Jiaqing's scheme to kill Qianlong
Jonathan Lee as Sheung Tung, a eunuch who is forced by Jiaqing to frame Yongxuan for poisoning the late Retired Emperor. He commits suicide by poison when Heshen captures him and attempts to make him be reframed.

White Lotus Sect
Wong Wai Tong as Chai Lam, Sect Leader
Episode 5: Commits suicide
Candice Chiu as Wong Chung-yi, wife of Chai Lam and later Sect Leader
Oscar Li as Yiu Tsz-fu, Branch Commander
Lena Li as Yip Ching-ching, a sect disciple
Jack Wu as Janggiya Nayancheng, Agui's grandson who infiltrates the White Lotus Sect on orders from Jiaqing

Others
Pinky Cheung as Tip Yee, a Tibetan woman and Heshen's informant
Alan Tam as Lam Kan, Tau Kau's friend and assistant
Osanna Chiu as Wo Wo Tau, Tau Kau's maid
Chan Min Leung as Chui King-wan, the Head Imperial Physician
Dolby Kwan as Sha Wai-yat, an Imperial Physician
Andy Sui as Chin King, an Imperial Physician
Mok Wai Man as Nyima Tseten, a highly skilled Tibetan physician
Forest Chan as Yuen Tsan, a blind fortune teller

Awards & Nominations

TVB Anniversary Gala

References

TVB original programming
Hong Kong television series
Hong Kong action television series
2010s Hong Kong television series
2018 Hong Kong television series debuts
Historical television series
Television series set in the 18th century
Television series set in the Qing dynasty